The Men competition of the high diving events at the 2022 European Aquatics Championships was held on 18, 19 and 20 August 2022.

It marked the first time a men's high diving event was conducted at a LEN European Aquatics Championships. Competition was contested from a 27 metre platform.

Results
The first round was held on 18 August at 18:15. The second round will be held on 19 August at 18:15. The last two rounds were started on 20 August at 18:00.

References

High diving Men